Erik Gunnar Ernfrid Rydberg (29 October 1896 – 3 December 1976) was a Swedish pole vaulter. He competed in the 1920 Summer Olympics and finished fifth. Rydberg was the national champion in 1920, 1922 and 1924, and set a national record at 3.90 m in 1922.

References

1896 births
1976 deaths
Swedish male pole vaulters
Olympic athletes of Sweden
Athletes (track and field) at the 1920 Summer Olympics
Athletes from Stockholm